Events from the year 1694 in Denmark

Incumbents
 Monarch – Christian V

Events
 Juellund Manor is established by Jens Juel.

Undated events
 The Jewish Cemetery in Nørrebro is inaugurated.

Births
 12 January  – Oluf Blach, merchant and shipowner (born 1767)
 20 June – Hans Adolph Brorson, bishop (died 1764)
 7 September – Johan Ludvig Holstein, statesman (died 1763)

Full date missing
 Frederick Moth, Governor-General of St. Thomas & St. John (died 1745)

Deaths
 5 August – Mogens Skeel, nobleman and writer (born 1651)

References

 
Denmark
Years of the 17th century in Denmark